Thomas Walter Ford (October, 1866 – May 27, 1917) was an American Association pitcher. Ford played for Columbus Solons and the Brooklyn Gladiators in the 1890 season. He played in 8 games in his one-year career, having a 0–6 record.

Ford was born and died in Chattanooga, Tennessee.

External links

1866 births
1917 deaths
Baseball players from Tennessee
Brooklyn Gladiators players
Chattanooga Blues players
Columbus Solons players
Jackson Jaxons players
Nashville Blues players
19th-century baseball players